Rajban is a small town near Paonta Sahib in the Sirmaur district in the Indian state of Himachal Pradesh.

RajBan, as the name suggests in Hindi, to be the 'Ban' (Vann or Jungle/ Forest) of Raja. Rajban is home to one of the oldest cement factory (CCI) in Himachal. It is located on the river bank, where river Tohns and river Giri converge. Rajban is a very small town with a dense forest adjacent to it and the high steep hills can be seen easily from the landscapes of the Rajban town. 

Basically Rajban is known for the central Governments establishment there known as Cement Corporation of India. Its quite a very large unit area wise and employing up to 500 workers working in the establishment. This industrial establishment has developed a good residential colony nearby the plant known as C.C.I Rajaban Colony for its employees. It has good facilities for them like hospital, school, small parks and a large playground within the boundaries of the colony. Earlier Kendriya Vidyalaya was there for the education of employees children but with the span of time the school has been changed and now Doon Valley School is providing education in that premises. The river giri flows nearby the rajban town which flowing thorough it meets Yamuna river making it bigger in size in Paonta Sahib. Nearby places of rajban town are Sirmour, Nahan, Sataun, Paonta Sahib, Muglowala, Gondpur Industrial Area, Saalwala, Renuka, Kamrao, and Shillai.

Sirmour (Sirmouri Tal or Rajban) is an interesting place with enriched history. They are ruins of an old city which is said to be loaded with curses and intriguing tales of betrayal, craftiness, and treachery attached to it. 
King Udit Prakash ruled Sirmour from 1217-1227 AD, during his regime he shifted his capital from Rajban to Kaalsi.

Rajban has always been a favourite point for neighbouring people to spend Dusshera Durga Puja and other festivals of the year. Holy temple La Devi also attracts a number of pilgrims throughout the year because of its vicinity and faith. With the setting up of Defence Research and Development Organisation, Rajban so seeing much advancements and an upgraded hub to find jobs at the sector.

Climate
During summer the temperature of the town remains between 0 and 40 °C and in the winters it comes down to 7 °C. During winter the temperature here remains a bit mild between 18 and 27 °C.

Cities and towns in Sirmaur district